Mark Michael Hutchinson is an English actor who won the 1993 Drama Desk Award for Outstanding Featured Actor in a Musical for his performance as Eddie in Blood Brothers.

His partner is Tony Slattery, a British comedian and actor. They met while performing in the musical Me and My Girl in the West End in 1986.

References

External links

English gay actors
Drama Desk Award winners
Year of birth missing (living people)
Living people
Place of birth missing (living people)
English male musical theatre actors